The 24th Legislative Assembly of British Columbia sat from September 1953 to 1956. The members were elected in the British Columbia general election held in June 1953. The Social Credit Party led by W. A. C. Bennett formed the government. The Co-operative Commonwealth Federation led by Arnold Webster formed the official opposition.

Thomas James Irwin served as speaker for the assembly.

Members of the 24th General Assembly 
The following members were elected to the assembly in 1953:

Notes:

Party standings

By-elections 
By-elections were held to replace members for various reasons:

Notes:

Other changes 
 Lorenzo Giovando leaves the Progressive Conservatives to become an Independent in July 1954.

References 

Political history of British Columbia
Terms of British Columbia Parliaments
1953 establishments in British Columbia
1956 disestablishments in British Columbia
20th century in British Columbia